The Juthungi (Greek: Iouthungoi, Latin: Iuthungi) were a Germanic tribe in the region north of the rivers Danube and Altmühl in what is now the modern German state of Bavaria.

The tribe was mentioned by the Roman historians Publius Herennius Dexippus and Ammianus Marcellinus. Their name appears together that of the Semnoni, leading some people to believe that they might have been one and the same. This, however, there is no etymological or historical proofs to prove or even indicate, they must likely just raided together a few times since the Semnoni is said to have become a part of the Alamanni by the 3rd century whom the Juthungi were almost constantly associated with. Their name is likely related to that of the "Jutes", with the classical Germanic "-Ungi" suffix added. Meaning "Jute-Ungi/Juthungi", the Jutings. Like the danish "Scyldings", which in Danish is pronounced "Skjoldunger" ("Skjold" meaning = Shield, and "-Unger" meaning = "-Ings"). 

The Juthungi invaded Italy in 259–260, but on their way back they were defeated near Augsburg on 24–25 April 260 by Marcus Simplicinius Genialis (this is recorded on a Roman victory altar found in 1992). At this time the Roman Empire lost control of this part of the limes. 

The Juthungi invaded Italy again in 271, defeating the Romans at the Battle of Placentia, but they were repulsed by Aurelian after the Battle of Fano and Battle of Pavia. 

Between 356 and 358 the Juthungi and the Alamanni invaded the province of Raetia, and destroyed Castra Regina (Regensburg), which was the Roman capital of the province, and one of the biggest Roman military camps in south Germany, with massive stone walls and a village. 

A second invasion of Raetia in 383 was repelled by an army of Alans and Huns. Between 429 and 431 the Roman general Aëtius also fought against the Juthungi in Raetia. He was unsuccessful, however, and so the Romans never tried or got the chance to fight them again.

Due to a lot of different Germanic tribes being generalised as Alemanni, Franks, Franconians or Bavarians, during the 4th and 5th centuries AD, their fate is ultimately unknown. But it is likely that the Juthungi became a part of one of these so called "coalitions" of people, and most likely the Alamanni, since they multiple times were mentioned together. 

No leader of the tribe was ever recorded, but it is likely that they were ruled under one king in the beginning, whereas they later might have split off into several groups all being led by different leaders set in different places.

Historical sources
 Augsburg Victory Altar (around 260)
 Dexippus, FGrHist 100 (around 270/271)
 Panegyrici Latini VIII 10.4 (around 297)
 Ammianus Marcellinus 17,6 (around 375)
 Sidonius Apollinaris, c. 7, 233 (around 429/430)

See also
List of ancient Germanic peoples 

Early Germanic peoples
Alemanni